Karin Rudström (born 2 July 1988 in Härnösand) is a Swedish curler from Stockholm.

Teams

Women's

Mixed

Mixed doubles

Private life
Rudström is from family of curlers. Her father Björn and her uncle (Björn's brother) Håkan are World and European champions. Håkan's daughter Amalia played for Sweden at the 2012 Winter Youth Olympics.

References

External links
 
 Karin Rudström – Profile on 2013 Winter Universiade site

Living people
1988 births
People from Härnösand
Swedish female curlers
World curling champions
Swedish curling champions
Sportspeople from Stockholm